The Gambian Cup is the top knockout tournament of the Gambian football. The current champion is Real Banjul who won their four title in 2019. The winner competes in the Gambian Super Cup and also qualifies into the CAF Confederation Cup each season, if the national league champion also wins the FA cup then the second placed cup club competes.

Wallidan FC has won the most titles, 23.

Winners

Before independence
 1952: Gambia United 2–1 Augustinians FC
 1954: Police
 1955: UAC
 1956: White Phantoms
 1957: Rainbow
 1958: White Phantoms
 1959: Black Diamonds
 1960: White Phantoms
 1961: White Phantoms
 1962: Augustinians
 1963: White Phantoms
 1964: White Phantoms
 1965: not played

Since independence
 1966: Arrance
 1967: Arrance
 1968: Augustinians
 1969: Real de Banjul 2-1 Young Lions
 1970: Real de Banjul 2–1 White Phantoms
 1971: Wallidan (Banjul)
 1972: Wallidan (Banjul)
 1973: Wallidan (Banjul)
 1974: Wallidan (Banjul)
 1975: Ports Authority (Banjul) vs Real Banjul
 1976: Wallidan (Banjul)
 1977: Wallidan (Banjul)
 1978: Wallidan (Banjul)
 1979: Dingareh
 1980: Ports Authority vs Real Banjul
 1981: Wallidan (Banjul)
 1982: Starlight Banjul
 1983: Hawks (Banjul)
 1984: Wallidan (Banjul)
 1985: Starlight Banjul
 1986: Wallidan (Banjul)
 1987: Wallidan (Banjul) 5–1 Hawks
 1988: Wallidan (Banjul)
 1989: not played
 1990: not played
 1991: not played
 1992: Wallidan (Banjul) bt Peak Marwich
 1993: Wallidan (Banjul) 2–1 Real de Banjul
 1994: Wallidan
 1995: Mass Sosseh bt Steve Biko
 1996: Hawks
 1997: Real de Banjul 1–0 Hawks (Banjul)
 1998: Wallidan (Banjul) 1–1 1–1 Gambia Ports Authority (Banjul) (aet, 4–3 pen)
 1999: Wallidan (Banjul) 1–1 Mass Sosseh (aet, 4–3 pen)
 2000: Steve Biko (Bakau) 1–1 Wallidan (Banjul) (aet, 4–2 pen)
 2001: Wallidan (Banjul) 3–0 Blackpool (Serrekunda East)
 2002: Wallidan (Banjul) 1–0 Real de Banjul
 2003: Wallidan (Banjul) 1–0 Hawks (Banjul)
 2004: Wallidan (Banjul) 1–1 Armed Forces (Banjul) (aet, 9–8 pen)
 2005: Bakau United 4–1 Wallidan (Banjul) (aet)
 2006: Hawks (Banjul) 3–0 Steve Biko FC (Bakau)
 2007: Ports Authority (Banjul) 1–0 Hawks (Banjul)
 2008: Wallidan (Banjul) 2–2 Samger (4–2 pen)
 2009: Young Africans (Banjul) 0–0 GAMTEL (Banjul) (3–1 pen)
 2010: GAMTEL (Banjul) 3–0 Hawks (Banjul)
 2011: GAMTEL (Banjul) 2–0 Ports Authority (Banjul)
 2012: GAMTEL (Banjul) 3–0 Interior FC (Serrekunda)
 2013: GAMTEL (Banjul) 1–1 Seaview (3–1 pen)
 2014: Banjul United (Banjul) 1–0 Hawks (Banjul)
 2015: Wallidan (Banjul) 2–0 GAMTEL
 2016: Brikama United (Brikama) 1-0 Bombada
 2017: Hawks (Banjul) 1–1 Real de Banjul (7–6 pen)
 2018: Armed Forces (Banjul) 4–3 Brikama United
 2019: Real de Banjul (Banjul) 1–0 Red Hawks
 2020: not played due to COVID-19 pandemic
 2021: not played due to COVID-19 pandemic

Performance by club
Only cups after independence are counted.

References

External links
 RSSSF.com

Football competitions in the Gambia
National association football cups
Recurring sporting events established in 1952